Horsetail tree may refer to:

 Rhoiptelea, a mountainous genus
 Casuarina equisetifolia, a coastal species